Gillian Joanna Merron, Baroness Merron  (born 12 April 1959) is a British politician and life peer serving as Chief Executive of the Board of Deputies of British Jews since 2014. A member of the Labour Party, she has been a shadow spokesperson for Health and Social Care since 2021. She was previously Member of Parliament (MP) for Lincoln from 1997 to 2010 and held several ministerial offices in the Blair and Brown governments.

Early life and career
Merron was born in Ilford, Essex to a Jewish family, and was educated at Wanstead High School in Wanstead in east London. She attended Lancaster University Management School, gaining a BSc (Hons) in Management Sciences. She worked in local government and as a NUPE (later UNISON) union official.

Merron joined the Labour Party in 1984. Before becoming an MP, Merron was the vice-chair for the regional Labour Party executive. She co-ordinated the shadow cabinet central region campaign in the 1992 general election and the 1994 European Parliament election.

Parliamentary career
Merron was made a prospective parliamentary candidate (PPC) through an all-women shortlist, and was elected to the House of Commons in May 1997 with a majority of 11,130. From July 1998 to July 1999, she served as Parliamentary Private Secretary (PPS) to Doug Henderson as Minister of State for the Armed Forces and, from July 1999 to June 2001, she was PPS to Baroness Symons as Minister of State for Defence Procurement.

From June 2001 to October 2002, Merron served as PPS to John Reid as Secretary of State for Northern Ireland. From October 2002 to May 2006, she was a government whip and was a Lord Commissioner of the Treasury from December 2004. At the 2005 general election, her majority was 4,613.

Merron was appointed to the Department for Transport in May 2006, where she worked until the reshuffle on 29 June 2007, when she became Parliamentary Secretary for the Cabinet Office and the first ever minister of the East Midlands.

Following Peter Hain's resignation on 24 January 2008, Merron was reshuffled again, becoming a Parliamentary Under-Secretary of State in the Department for International Development, leaving both of her previous roles. Following Gordon Brown's next reshuffle on 5 October 2008, Merron was moved to the Foreign Office and Commonwealth Office. A promotion to Minister of State for Public Health soon followed.

Merron followed the party whip in votes on equal gay rights, the hunting ban, foundation hospitals, a ban on smoking in public places, the Iraq war, preventative laws to stop climate change, and The Digital Economy Bill. She lost her seat to the Conservative candidate Karl McCartney in the 2010 general election. From 1997 until 2007, when Quentin Davies defected to the Labour Party, she had been Lincolnshire's only Labour MP - and the first since Margaret Beckett had the seat from 1974 to 1979.

Expenses
Merron MP's expense were higher than average. She is one of 98 MPs who voted to support Conservative MP David Maclean's bill to keep their expenses and correspondence secret.

On 19 June 2009, MP's expenses were revealed (heavily edited) on the Internet. Merron received criticism for purchasing a television, television stand, home theatre kit, and numerous other goods. She wrote on her website: "The majority of claims I make directly pay for professional staff, office costs, communication with constituents, and travel. I do not have a second job, do not employ any family members or friends, nor have I taken the annual increase in ministerial salary."

In the aftermath of the United Kingdom Parliamentary expenses scandal, Sir Thomas Legg recommended that Gillian Merron repay £6,305.17.
 She repaid this amount in full.

Post-parliamentary career
Since her defeat at the 2010 general election, Merron has become Chair of Bus Users UK formerly known as The National Federation of Bus Users.

In May 2014, it was announced that Merron would become Chief Executive of the Board of Deputies of British Jews the following July. Since February 2013, she has served as a Vice-President of the Jewish Leadership Council and served as external affairs officer on the board of Liberal Judaism from July 2012 to May 2014.

House of Lords 
In December 2020, it was announced Merron would be conferred a life peerage after a nomination by Labour Party leader Keir Starmer. She took her seat on 8 February 2021, and made her maiden speech on 13 May during that year's Queen's Speech debate.

In the May shadow cabinet reshuffle, she was appointed to the Shadow Health Team. In the November shadow cabinet reshuffle, she became Shadow Culture Minister.

References

External links

 Guardian Unlimited Politics – Ask Aristotle: Gillian Merron MP
 TheyWorkForYou.com – Gillian Merron MP

1959 births
Living people
Alumni of Lancaster University
Labour Party (UK) MPs for English constituencies
Female members of the Parliament of the United Kingdom for English constituencies
British trade unionists
English Jews
People from Ilford
UK MPs 1997–2001
UK MPs 2001–2005
UK MPs 2005–2010
Politics of Lincoln, England
Jewish British politicians
Jewish women politicians
Labour Party (UK) life peers
Members of the Parliament of the United Kingdom for Lincoln
Women trade unionists
20th-century British women politicians
21st-century British women politicians
20th-century English women
20th-century English people
21st-century English women
21st-century English people
Life peeresses created by Elizabeth II